London Buses route 141 is a Transport for London contracted bus route in London, England. Running between Palmers Green and London Bridge bus station, it is operated by Arriva London.

History

The route was retained by Arriva London with a contract awarded in May 2005.

Route 141 was the first route to be served by hybrid electric double-decker buses, with the first one entering service in March 2007.

A bus operating on route 141 was involved in an accident near Monument station on 24 February 2010. Eleven people including the driver were injured when the bus crashed into a set of railings and narrowly avoided falling down the steps into the station.

Upon being re-tendered, route 141 was retained by Arriva London with a new contract commencing on 12 January 2013. In August 2014, a bus on the route was used to test technology that displays seat availability on a screen at the base of the stairs.

Current route
Route 141 operates via these primary locations:
Palmers Green North Circular Road
Wood Green station 
Turnpike Lane station 
Harringay Green Lanes station 
Manor House station  
Newington Green
Hoxton
Old Street station  
Moorgate station   
Bank station  
Monument station 
London Bridge
London Bridge bus station  for London Bridge station

References

External links

Bus routes in London
Transport in the London Borough of Enfield
Transport in the London Borough of Haringey
Transport in the London Borough of Hackney
Transport in the London Borough of Islington
Transport in the London Borough of Southwark
Transport in the City of London